Humayan Ahmed (born 7 September 2000) is a Bangladeshi cricketer. He made his List A debut for Bangladesh Krira Shikkha Protishtan in the 2018–19 Dhaka Premier Division Cricket League on 18 April 2019.

References

External links
 

2000 births
Living people
Bangladeshi cricketers
Bangladesh Krira Shikkha Protishtan cricketers
People from Cox's Bazar District